Merlene Joyce Ottey  (born 10 May 1960) is a Jamaican-Slovenian former track and field sprinter. She began her career representing Jamaica in 1978, and continued to do so for 24 years, before representing Slovenia from 2002 to 2012. She is ranked fourth on the all-time list over 60 metres (indoor), eighth on the all-time list over 100 metres and sixth on the all-time list over 200 metres. She is the current world indoor record holder for 200 metres with 21.87 seconds, set in 1993. She was named Jamaican Sportswoman of the Year 13 times between 1979 and 1995.

Ottey had the longest career as a top-level international sprinter appearing at the 1979 Pan American Games as a 19-year-old fresh from U-20 and Junior competitions, and concluding her career at age 52 when she anchored the Slovene 4 × 100 m relay team at the 2012 European Championships.

A nine-time Olympic medalist, she holds the record for the most Olympic appearances (seven) of any track and field athlete. Although gold medal success at the Olympics eluded Ottey, she was able to bring home three silvers and six bronze medals. She won 14 World Championship medals, and still holds the record (as of 2017) for most medals in individual events with 10. Her career achievements and longevity led to her being called the "Queen of the Track". Her proclivity for earning bronze medals in major championships earned her the title of "Bronze Queen" in track circles.

Ottey was formerly married to the American high jumper and 400 m hurdler Nat Page and was known as Merlene Ottey-Page during the mid-1980s.

Life and sprinting career

Merlene Ottey was born to Hubert and Joan Ottey in Cold Spring, Hanover, Jamaica. She was introduced to the sport by her mother, who bought her a manual on track and field. 

In her early school years in the 1970s, Ottey attended Gurneys Mount and Pondside Schools before graduating from Rusea's and Vere Technical high schools. There she frequently competed barefoot in local races.

Ottey's inspiration came from listening to the track and field broadcast from the 1976 Summer Olympics in Montreal, where Donald Quarrie ran in the sprint finals. Her athletics career took off when she moved to the US and attended the University of Nebraska in 1979, where she joined the track team. She won 14 individual national titles and earned 24 All-America awards, both of which are the most by any Husker student-athlete. Ottey won multiple NCAA titles in each of her five total seasons, including five combined indoor and outdoor titles in 1982 and four in 1981. She earned multiple All-America accolades in each of her five seasons, with seven combined All-America awards in 1982, six in 1980 and five in 1981. Ottey was also a member of Nebraska's indoor national championship teams in 1982, 1983 and 1984. She still holds Nebraska's top indoor marks in the 55- and 200-meter dashes and the program's top outdoor marks in the 100- and 200-meter dashes.

She represented Jamaica in the 1979 Pan American Games, winning a bronze medal in the 200 m. She graduated from university with a Bachelor of Arts Degree and married fellow athlete Nathaniel Page in 1984 and briefly used the name Merlene Ottey-Page. The couple later divorced.

In the 1980 Moscow games, Ottey became the first female English-speaking Caribbean athlete to win an Olympic medal. Back in Jamaica, she was awarded an Officer of the Order of Nation, and the Order of Distinction for "services in the field of sport".

In the 1982 Commonwealth Games, Ottey won a gold medal in the 200 m and silver medal in the 100 m. Nearly a decade later, in the 1990 Commonwealth Games, she won gold in both events. Ottey was named Ambassador of Jamaica after her gold medal win in the 1993 world championships. She has also been named Jamaican Sportswoman of the Year 13 times between 1979 and 1995.

Throughout her career, she has won nine Olympic medals, which ties with Allyson Felix for the most by any woman in track and field history . These include three silver and six bronze medals. She has never won an Olympic gold medal, but lost by five thousandths of a second to Gail Devers in the 100 m Final at the 1996 Summer Olympics in Atlanta when they both recorded the same time of 10.94 seconds. This was not her closest finish to Devers – she recorded a time of 10.812 seconds to Devers' 10.811 seconds in the 1993 World Championships in Stuttgart – still the closest finish at an international athletics meet.

Her seven Olympic appearances from 1980 to 2004 are the second most by any Track & Field athlete, after Spanish race walker Jesús Ángel García.

She held the record for most World Championship medals, winning 14 (three gold, three silver, eight bronze) between 1983 and 1997, until Allyson Felix took her total from 13 to 16 in 2017 and then to 18 in 2019. Ottey still holds the record for most World Championship medals in individual events, with 10. 13 of her medals at the Olympics and World Championships were bronze, earning her the nickname "the Bronze Queen" in racing circles. Ottey was appointed an Ambassador at Large by the Jamaican government in 1993. She was inducted in Nebraska's first Athletics Hall of Fame Class in 2015.

Controversy

In 1999, during a meet in Lucerne, Switzerland, a urine sample submitted had returned positive for the banned anabolic steroid nandrolone. Her 'B' sample also contained higher than normal levels of the substance. Ottey was subsequently banned by the IAAF from competing in the World Championships in Seville, Spain.

Ottey fought to clear her name, asserting that charge was a "terrible mistake", and that she was innocent of knowingly taking steroids. In the summer of 2000, Ottey was cleared of all charges by the Jamaica Amateur Athletic Association; the IAAF lifted its two-year ban, after the CAS dismissed the case. The Court of Arbitration for Sport dismissed the case because the retesting order by the CAS was not completed in the time frame allotted.

In Jamaica, at the National Senior Trials before selection for the Olympics, Ottey placed a disappointing fourth. According to the rules of the Jamaica Amateur Athletics Association (JAAA), only athletes who had finished in the top three at the trials were eligible to run at the Olympics; she was only qualified to run on the 4 x 100 m relay team. Ottey asked that she be substituted for another team member, a courtesy that had been extended to others in the past. The JAAA's decision to replace Peta-Gaye Dowdie with Ottey caused widespread controversy. Dowdie's team members and many Jamaicans believed that Ottey had bullied her way onto the team. Jamaican 400 m Olympian and championship medallist Gregory Haughton led the notorious "Games Village" protests to oust Ottey, which made international headlines. The protest ended when The International Olympic Committee (IOC) threatened to throw the Jamaicans out of the Games if the team managers were not able to control their charges.

At the 2000 Olympics, Ottey finished fourth in the 100 m, beaten from a medal by fellow Jamaican sprinter Tayna Lawrence. The race was won by Marion Jones, who registered 10.75 seconds, followed by Ekaterini Thanou of Greece in 11.12 seconds. Lawrence posted 11.18 seconds to Ottey's 11.19 seconds. In the 4×100 relay, the Jamaican team – bronze medalist Lawrence, teenager and newcomer Veronica Campbell, and Beverly McDonald – was anchored by Ottey to a silver medal. This medal gave Ottey her eighth medal, the most ever for a female athlete.  Nine years later, after the disqualification of Jones for steroid abuse, Ottey's fourth place was retroactively promoted to third – giving Ottey her ninth medal – and Lawrence to second.

Due to the controversy, Ottey decided that "after Sydney I said I wasn't going to run another race for Jamaica ... because I felt like the Jamaicans were trying to push me out of the sport and I really needed to prove my point, that I might be 40 but I can still run."

Slovenia
In 1998 Ottey moved to Slovenia and began training with Slovene coach Srđan Đorđević. There she was still representing Jamaica. However, in May 2002, she became a Slovene citizen, and resided in Ljubljana, where she represented her new country in international events.

Ottey competed for Slovenia in the 100 metres at the 2004 Summer Olympics in Athens, where she reached the semifinals.  She finished 5th, missing out on qualification for the final by just 0.03s. At age 46, she competed in the 2006 European Championships in Athletics. She finished fifth in the semi-finals of the 100 metres and did not qualify for the final, which was won by Belgium's Kim Gevaert.

Ottey failed by 0.28 seconds to reach her eighth Olympic Games, aged 48 in 2008. In spite of this, two years later she qualified for the Slovenian 4 x 100-metre relay squad at the 2010 European Athletics Championships where she became the oldest athlete ever to participate in the history of the European championships.

At the age of 52, Ottey competed in the 4x100 meters relay at the 2012 European Athletics Championships. The Slovenian team were ranked 22nd in the world before the 2012 Olympics with only the top 16 teams qualifying.

Since 2014, Ottey has lived in Switzerland.

Records and achievements

Ottey ranks at number four on the all-time list of the 200 metres, and number seven on the 100 metres list.
In 1990, Ottey was awarded the World Athlete of the Year and the Track & Field News Athlete of the Year awards
Ottey is the first female athlete to run 60 metres under seven seconds (6.96 in 1992)
Ottey is the only woman to have run the 200 metres under 22 seconds indoors (21.87 in 1993). 
Ottey has the fastest 100 and 200 metres one day combination, with 10.93 and 21.66 (32.59 total) at the 1990 Weltklasse Zurich grand prix.
Ottey has run 100 metres under eleven seconds – 67 times ( plus 9 wind-assisted ) a record among female sprinters.
Ottey has run 200 metres under twenty-two seconds - 18 times (plus once wind-assisted) another record among female sprinters. 
Ottey has 57 consecutive wins in 100 metres – the most consecutive wins over 100 metres for a female, and 34 consecutive wins at 200 metres.
Ottey holds the official World Masters Athletics world records in the 100 m and 200 m for the age groups W35 ( 100- 10.74 in 1996, 200- 21.93 in 1995 ) W40 ( 100- 10.99 in 2000, 200- 22.74 in 2004 ) W45 ( 100- 11.34 in 2006, 200- 23.82 in 2006 ) W50 ( 100- 11.67 in 2010, 200- 24.33 in 2010 ).
Ottey is the first from the Western Hemisphere (outside the USA) to win two individual medals at the same Olympic Games.
At the 1995 World Championships, Ottey became the oldest ever female gold medallist when she won the 200 m at age 35 years 92 days. At the 1997 World Championships in Athens, she became the oldest female medallist ever at 37 years 90 days, when she won the bronze medal. In the 2000 Olympics, at age 40, Ottey became the oldest female track and field medalist when she anchored the Jamaican women's 4×100 metres to a silver medal.  With the disqualification of Marion Jones, she was awarded the bronze medal in the 100 metres, making her the oldest individual medallist.
Ottey along with Carl Lewis, Usain Bolt and Allyson Felix, is one of four athletes to win twenty or more medals at the Olympic Games and the World Championships (combined).
Ottey holds the record for running the fastest women's Indoor 200 metres, in 21.87 seconds. This record has stood since 1993 and remains (as of 2016) the only sub 22sec clocking by a woman indoors.
In six World Championships competing for Jamaica, Ottey has won fourteen medals: three gold, four silver and seven bronze medals, while at the Olympics she has earned three silver and six bronze medals.
Ottey was the first female Caribbean athlete to win an Olympic medal.
Ottey has won the most career Olympic medals (9 medals: 3 silver and 6 bronze) in women's track and field, a record now shared with American sprinter Allyson Felix (6 gold and 3 silver).
Ottey has the quickest 200m performance ever into a headwind (-1.0m/sec or more ) achieved when clocking 21.66 (-1.0) in Zurich, 1990.
Ottey has won the Jamaican Sportsperson of the Year (sportswoman) a record 13 times, first winning in 1979 and last winning in 1995, no man or woman has won the award more.

International competitions

See also
List of athletes with the most appearances at Olympic Games
List of multiple Summer Olympic medalists

References

External links

Merlene Ottey & the advance of women
The Merlene Ottey Tribute

1960 births
Living people
People from Hanover Parish
Jamaican female sprinters
Slovenian female sprinters
Slovenian masters athletes
Jamaican masters athletes
Olympic athletes of Jamaica
Olympic silver medalists for Jamaica
Olympic bronze medalists for Jamaica
Athletes (track and field) at the 1980 Summer Olympics
Athletes (track and field) at the 1984 Summer Olympics
Athletes (track and field) at the 1988 Summer Olympics
Athletes (track and field) at the 1992 Summer Olympics
Athletes (track and field) at the 1996 Summer Olympics
Athletes (track and field) at the 2000 Summer Olympics
Olympic athletes of Slovenia
Athletes (track and field) at the 2004 Summer Olympics
Commonwealth Games medallists in athletics
Commonwealth Games gold medallists for Jamaica
Commonwealth Games silver medallists for Jamaica
Athletes (track and field) at the 1982 Commonwealth Games
Athletes (track and field) at the 1990 Commonwealth Games
Pan American Games medalists in athletics (track and field)
Athletes (track and field) at the 1979 Pan American Games
World Athletics Championships athletes for Jamaica
World Athletics Championships athletes for Slovenia
World Athletics Championships medalists
World Athletics Indoor Championships winners
World Athletics Indoor Championships medalists
World record holders in masters athletics
Fenerbahçe athletes
Nebraska Cornhuskers women's track and field athletes
Members of the Order of Jamaica
Recipients of the Order of Distinction
Recipients of the Order of the Nation
Medalists at the 2000 Summer Olympics
Jamaican emigrants to Slovenia
Medalists at the 1996 Summer Olympics
Medalists at the 1992 Summer Olympics
Medalists at the 1984 Summer Olympics
Medalists at the 1980 Summer Olympics
Commonwealth Games bronze medallists for Jamaica
Pan American Games silver medalists for Jamaica
Pan American Games bronze medalists for Jamaica
Olympic silver medalists in athletics (track and field)
Olympic bronze medalists in athletics (track and field)
World Athletics indoor record holders
Track & Field News Athlete of the Year winners
IAAF World Athlete of the Year
USA Outdoor Track and Field Championships winners
World Athletics Championships winners
Competitors at the 1998 Goodwill Games
Medalists at the 1979 Pan American Games
Olympic female sprinters
Medallists at the 1982 Commonwealth Games
Medallists at the 1990 Commonwealth Games